This is a list of proprietary source-available software, which has available source code, but is not classified as free software or open-source software. In some cases, this type of software is originally sold and released without the source code, and the source code becomes available later. Sometimes, the source code is released under a liberal software license at its end of life as abandonware. This type of software can also have its source code leaked or reverse engineered.

While such software often later becomes open source software or public domain, other constructs and software licenses exist, for instance shared source or creative commons licenses. If the source code is given out without specified license or public domain waiver it has legally to be considered as still proprietary due to the Berne Convention.

For a list of video game software with available source code, see List of commercial video games with available source code. For specifically formerly proprietary software which is now free software, see List of formerly proprietary software.

See also
 List of commercial video games with available source code
 List of formerly proprietary software
 Open-core model
 Source-available software

References

Free software lists and comparisons